John Noble (fl. 1417–1427) of Salisbury, Wiltshire, was an English politician.

Family
His wife was named Lucy. She died in September or October 1402. They shared a house in Castle Street, Salisbury. Nothing further is known of his family.

Career
He was a Member (MP) of the Parliament of England for Old Sarum in 1417. He was Mayor of Salisbury in 1426–27. His main occupation is unrecorded, but he may have been a wool merchant.

References

14th-century births
15th-century deaths
English MPs 1417
People from Salisbury
Mayors of Salisbury
Members of the Parliament of England (pre-1707) for Old Sarum